Alexander Colwell White (December 12, 1833 – June 11, 1906) was an American teacher and lawyer from Brookville, Pennsylvania. He represented Pennsylvania in the U.S. House from 1885 to 1887.

Biography
Alexander C. White was born near Kittanning, Pennsylvania.  He attended the public schools, and taught school.  He attended the Jacksonville Institute and the Dayton Union Academy.  He moved to Jefferson County, Pennsylvania, in 1860 where he studied law.  He was admitted to the bar in 1862, and commenced practice in Punxsutawney, Pennsylvania.

During the American Civil War, White enlisted in the Union Army as a private in Company I, Eighth Regiment, Pennsylvania Volunteer Infantry.

After the war, he moved to Brookville, Pennsylvania, and continued the practice of his profession.  He was elected district attorney in 1867 and 1870.

White was elected as a Republican to the Forty-ninth Congress.  He was not a candidate for reelection in 1886 to the Fiftieth Congress.  He resumed the practice of his profession, and served as justice of the peace for Rose Township, Pennsylvania.  He died near Brookville.  Interment in Brookville Cemetery.

References
 Retrieved on 2008-02-14
The Political Graveyard

1833 births
1906 deaths
Pennsylvania lawyers
Union Army soldiers
Republican Party members of the United States House of Representatives from Pennsylvania
Burials in Pennsylvania
19th-century American politicians